Ksar-El-Kelb is a location in Tunisia. 
It existed in the Roman province of Numidia and has been suggested as a plausible location (along Ksar-Bou-Saïd and Henchir-El-Abiodh) of the Ancient city and former bishopric of Vegesela in Numidia, which remains a Latin Catholic titular see.

History 
The name means Castle of the Dog, and was known in antiquity as Vegesela when it was a Roman Era Imperial estate and a station on the African Limes between Bagai and Theveste located at 7.48551 35.37199.

The town had a rectangular  Basilica and was a center of Donatist beliefs. This Church Building was a memorial to and possibly burial for the Donatist Bishop and Martyr Maculus. In 347 imperial emissary, Macarius, sent by Constans, stopped here during his purge of the Donastists. Maculus and 9 other bishops were executed and tortured by Macarius. an event that damaged relationships between Donatist and Roman Catholics till the Muslim conquest of the Maghreb, 300 years later. The event was still the basis of hostilities generations later and in many ways birthed the Donatist idea of resistance to the state.

In Roman Antiquity the town and bishopric of Germania in Numidia was nearby.

References 

Ancient Berber cities
Roman towns and cities in Tunisia